"Even When I'm Sleeping" is a song by Australian band Leonardo's Bride that was the second single from their first studio album, Angel Blood. Released on 13 April 1997, "Even When I'm Sleeping" peaked at No. 4 on the Australian Recording Industry Association (ARIA) Singles Chart in July 1997 and was certified Gold.

In May 2001 "Even When I'm Sleeping", written by guitarist-keyboardist, Dean Manning, was selected by Australasian Performing Right Association (APRA) as one of the Top 30 Australian songs of all time.

Background
Leonardo's Bride formed in 1989, when Abby Dobson and Dean Manning performed together at an open mike night at the Crossroads Theatre in Sydney. Dobson and Manning travelled around Europe and America busking and playing in clubs and bars. In 1992, the band had its first performance in Sydney with a new line-up, consisting of Dobson on vocals, Manning on guitar, bouzouki and vocals, Alex Hewetson on double bass and Antero Ceschin on drums. They released their first EP in 1993 entitled Leonardo's Bride. In 1994, Patrick Hyndes and Jon Howell joined; they released a second EP in 1995 titled Temperamental Friend.

In 1996 Leonardo's Bride recorded their debut album, Angel Blood, and released the album's first single "So Brand New" in October 1996. The second single, "Even When I'm Sleeping", saw commercial success for the band, which peaked at No. 4 on the ARIA Singles Chart and No. 34 on the Recording Industry Association of New Zealand (RIANZ) Singles Charts. The single was certified Gold by the Australian Recording Industry Association. "Even When I'm Sleeping" was nominated for 'Single of the Year' at the ARIA Music Awards of 1997. The song also went on to win 'Song of the Year' at the Australasian Performing Right Association (APRA) Music Awards of 1998 for Manning's song writing.

It has subsequently been covered by a dozen artists internationally including a French version that was a hit for Véronic DiCaire in Canada. It was also featured on Australian pop singer John Farnham's 2005 covers album – I Remember When I Was Young.

Track listing
Australian CD single
 "Even When I'm Sleeping" (Dean Manning) – 3:55
 "Break" (Patrick Wong) – 3:21
 "Stay" (Three Cheese Mix) – 3:27

Personnel
Leonardo's Bride members
 Abby Dobson – lead vocal, acoustic guitar
 Jon Howell – drums
 Dean Manning – electric guitar, piano, wurlitzer, hammond
 Patrick Wong – bass guitar, backing vocals, cello

Production details
Producer – Justin Stanley
Engineer - Keith Cooper
Mixer - Justin Stanley

Charts

Weekly charts

Year-end charts

Certifications

References

1997 singles
1997 songs
APRA Award winners
Leonardo's Bride songs
Mushroom Records singles